Edward Calvert may refer to:

 Eddie Calvert (1922–1978), brass musician
 Edward Calvert (architect) (c. 1847–1914), Scottish domestic architect
 Edward Calvert (painter) (1799–1883), English printmaker and painter